Elmira Antommarchi (born in Cúcuta, Colombia) was a Colombian poet who published numerous poems. All her poems appear in various anthologies. Elmira's sisters, Hortensia Antommarchi and Dorila Antommarchi, were also published poets. Elmira died in Cúcuta, Colombia.

See also

 François Carlo Antommarchi

References

People from Cúcuta
Year of death missing
Colombian women poets
Colombian people of French descent
Year of birth missing
19th-century Colombian writers
19th-century Colombian women writers
19th-century Colombian poets